"Shiny Happy People" is a song by American rock band R.E.M., released as the second single from their seventh studio album, Out of Time (1991). It features guest vocals by Kate Pierson of the B-52's, who also appears in the music video. According to the singer Michael Stipe, the lyrics are a satirical translation of the Chinese government's propaganda following the 1989 Tiananmen Square protests. 

"Shiny Happy People" was released as a single in May 1991 in the United Kingdom, and four months later in the United States. It reached number 10 on the US Billboard Hot 100, the fourth and last R.E.M. single to reach the top 10. It reached number six on the UK Singles Chart, becoming the first R.E.M. song to reach the top 10 in the UK and the only one to reach the top 10 in both countries. It is R.E.M.'s most successful song in Ireland, where it reached second place, and in Germany, where it reached number 10.

R.E.M. performed the song with Pierson on Saturday Night Live on April 13, 1991. It was used as the theme song to the unaired pilot for the sitcom Friends, before it was replaced by the Rembrandts' "I'll Be There for You", and was briefly used in the first season's tenth episode, "The One with the Monkey". R.E.M. was ambivalent about being known for a pop song widely perceived as lacking gravitas. Stipe said in 2016: "It's a fruity pop song written for children ... If there was one song that was sent into outer space to represent R.E.M. for the rest of time, I would not want it to be 'Shiny Happy People.

Writing
The R.E.M. singer Michael Stipe took the phrase "shiny happy people" from Chinese propaganda posters used after the 1989 Tiananmen Square protests. Stipe described the song as a "really fruity, kind of bubblegum song". "Shiny Happy People" features guest vocals from Kate Pierson, of another Athens band, the B-52's.

Critical reception
Larry Flick from Billboard wrote, "Ace guitarist Peter Buck drives alternative band further into the mainstream on this commercially accessible, hook-driven pop tune." He stated that Pierson "contributes splendid vocal harmonies on infectious, sing-along chorus". Richard Wagamese from Calgary Herald felt Stipe "sounds almost ebullient on the bouncy 'Shiny Happy People' and that alone is radical. R.E.M.'s guitar foundation is also replaced by the occasional bass clarinet, cello, and flugelhorn." Irish Drogheda Independent declared it as "unbelievably catchy", while Scottish Dundee Courier described it as "sardonic but delicious disposable pop". A reviewer from Evening Herald called it a "gilt-edged" pop hit. Liverpool Echo felt the song "comes at you concealed as bubble gum pop in the guise of an opening string arrangement even Kylie Minogue wouldn't thank you for—before it throws off the cloak of conformity and gets down to a more resonant rendition of power pop". 

Pan-European magazine Music & Media described it as "heaven on earth", adding that Pierson's voice is "as prominent as it was" on Iggy Pop's song, "Candy". People Magazine stated that Pierson "added some spark". Mark Frith from Smash Hits remarked that the song is "very summery, optimistic and has some fine vocals" from Pierson. He added, "It's so good that it will make you too want to go around and give the world a great big hug. Summer's here and everything's groovy." Celia Farber from Spin found that it "is the most accessible" song of the album, noting the waltz-time break in the middle of the song as one of "the least R.E.M.-like stuff", that works best on the album. The Sunday Tribune felt that it "waltzes joyfully" with the added vocal attraction of Pierson, and noted the "joyous" and "celebratory" noises, calling it "one of 1991's pure pop highlights".

Retrospective response
In an 2016 retrospective review, Justin Chadwick from Albumism described the song as "buoyant" and R.E.M.'s "most unabashedly pop-fueled composition of their career". He added further, "Regardless of the song's true inspirations or whether you care for the song or not, I suspect most can agree that the soaring backing vocals supplied by Kate Pierson ... are the unequivocal highlight." In 1998, the Daily Vault's Christopher Thelen said it's the song "that dared to show a new side of R.E.M. - a, well, happy side. Who woulda thunk it? The song is a tad cornball, but is infectiously catchy, nonetheless." Terry Staunton from NME declared it as "bubbly", noting that the song "opens with a lilting waltz before breaking into a sun-drenched pop anthem, a warm and welcome blood relative to the B-52s' own 'Love Shack'."

Legacy
In its 2006 "Song of the Summer" countdown, CBC Radio's Freestyle named "Shiny Happy People" 1991's "Song of the Summer". By contrast, in 2006, the song received the No. 1 position on AOL Music's list of the "111 Wussiest Songs of All Time". Blender magazine also ranked the song No. 35 on its list of the "50 Worst Songs Ever", and Q included it in a list of "Ten Terrible Records by Great Artists" in 2005.

When Stipe made an appearance on Space Ghost Coast to Coast in 1995, he said he hated the song. It was one of their few Warner-released singles not included on their 2003 greatest hits album In Time, and R.E.M. have rarely played it. However, over time, Stipe's position on the song has softened. Speaking in 2011, Stipe said he was "always at peace" with it, but that it was "embarrassing" that it had become a hit. He said: "Many people's idea of R.E.M, and me in particular, is very serious, with me being a very serious kind of poet. But I'm also actually quite funny – hey, my bandmates think so, my family thinks so, my boyfriend thinks so, so I must be – but that doesn't always come through in the music.... (But) I'm in 'Shiny Happy People', 'Stand', 'Pop Song 89', 'Get Up', too. Our fruitloop songs!"

Track listings
All songs were written by Bill Berry, Peter Buck, Mike Mills, and Michael Stipe unless otherwise stated.

US and UK 7-inch and cassette single
 "Shiny Happy People" (album version) – 3:44
 "Forty Second Song" – 1:20

UK 12-inch and CD single
 "Shiny Happy People" – 3:45
 "Forty Second Song" – 1:20
 "Losing My Religion" (live acoustic version, recorded on Rockline, April 1, 1991.) – 4:36

UK limited-edition CD single
 "Shiny Happy People" – 3:45
 "I Remember California" (live, from Tourfilm) – 5:42
 "Get Up" (live, from Tourfilm) – 3:15
 "Pop Song '89" (live, from Tourfilm) – 3:30

Personnel
Personnel are adapted from the Out of Time liner notes.

R.E.M.
 Bill Berry – drums
 Peter Buck – electric guitar
 Mike Mills – bass guitar, vocals, organ
 Michael Stipe – lead vocals

Additional musicians
 David Arenz – violin
 Ellie Arenz – violin
 Mark Bingham – string arrangements
 David Braitberg – violin
 Andrew Cox – cello
 Reid Harris – viola
 Peter Holsapple – acoustic guitar
 Ralph Jones – double bass
 Dave Kempers – violin
 Elizabeth Murphy – cello
 Paul Murphy – lead viola
 Kate Pierson – vocals

Charts

Weekly charts

Year-end charts

Certifications

Other versions
"Shiny Happy People" is one of several anachronistic songs that appear in the 2013 video game BioShock Infinite, which is set in 1912. This version of the song is performed as an Al Jolson-esque big band piece by Tony Babino (vocals), Scott Bradlee (arrangement and piano), Adam Kubota, Allan Mednard, and Tom Abbott.

References

1991 singles
1991 songs
American pop rock songs
Male–female vocal duets
R.E.M. songs
Song recordings produced by Bill Berry
Song recordings produced by Michael Stipe
Song recordings produced by Mike Mills
Song recordings produced by Peter Buck
Song recordings produced by Scott Litt
Songs written by Bill Berry
Songs written by Michael Stipe
Songs written by Mike Mills
Songs written by Peter Buck
Warner Records singles